Sherif Olatundé Jimoh (born 4 May 1996) is an Ivorian international footballer who plays as a defender for BATE Borisov.

Club career
In 2014, Jimoh was invited to trial with Swiss side FC Basel.

International career
Jimoh represented the Ivory Coast under 17 side at the 2013 FIFA U-17 World Cup, the under 20 side at the 2015 African U-20 Championship and the under 22 side at the 2015 Toulon Tournament. He made his senior international debut in October 2015 in a 2–1 defeat by Ghana.

International statistics

References

External links
  (pre-2019)
 
 CAF Profile
 FIFA Profile

1996 births
Living people
Ivorian footballers
Ivory Coast international footballers
Ivory Coast under-20 international footballers
Association football defenders
Ivory Coast youth international footballers
Ivorian expatriate footballers
Expatriate footballers in Belarus
FC San-Pédro players
FC Neman Grodno players
FC BATE Borisov players